Simona Muccioli (born March 15, 1984) is an Olympic swimmer from San Marino. She has swum for San Marino at the Olympics (2008), World Championships (2003, 2005, 2007, 2009, 2011) and Mediterranean Games (2005), and other international meets.

As of August 2013, she holds the long course San Marino Records in 10 events (400, 800, 1500 and 5,000 frees; 50, 100, 200 flies; and 200 and 400 IM).

At the 2008 Olympics, she swam in the first heat of the Women's 100 Butterfly, finishing in 1:04.91 for last place overall.

References

External links
NBC 2008 Olympics profile

Sammarinese female swimmers
Living people
Olympic swimmers of San Marino
Swimmers at the 2008 Summer Olympics
Female butterfly swimmers
1984 births